Marcus John Armstrong (born 29 July 2000) is a New Zealand motor racing driver. He is due to compete in the NTT IndyCar Series on road and street courses with Chip Ganassi Racing in 2023. Previously he competed in the FIA Formula 2 Championship between 2020 and 2022. He was a member of the Ferrari Driver Academy between 2017 and 2021.

Armstrong started single-seaters in 2014, and in the following year won his only single-seater title to date in the 2017 Italian F4 Championship whilst becoming runner-up in the 2017 ADAC Formula 4 Championship. He stepped to the FIA Formula 3 European Championship in 2018, ending 5th. The championship merged into the FIA Formula 3 Championship in 2019, and Armstrong became runner-up to teammate Robert Shwartzman. He was promoted to the 2020 Formula 2 Championship with ART Grand Prix but a difficult season saw him finish 13th. He also finished in the same position in the following year with DAMS, and came 13th again in the 2022 Formula 2 Championship with Hitech Grand Prix.

Junior racing career 
Born in Christchurch, Armstrong began karting in 2010, winning all his major titles in New Zealand from 2011 to 2014. He did not achieve much in international competitions, placing a highest of 12th during the Karting World Championship in the KF2 category in 2015. While still karting, Armstrong graduated to single seaters in 2014 in the 2014–15 season of New Zealand Formula Ford Championship, ending seventh in the standings. In an article by Motorsport.com, Armstrong was ranked third of the most exciting karting talents of 2016.

Lower formulae

2016 
In November 2015, Armstrong tested a Eurocup Formula Renault 2.0 car in 2015 Eurocup Formula Renault 2.0 post-season test. In 2016, Armstrong once again diversified his karting with stints in BRDC British Formula 3 and the two Formula Renault 2.0 series. In the latter series, he competed as a guest driver during the final round at Estoril, and finished ninth and tenth.

2017 Toyota Racing Series 
In November 2016, Armstrong was among five drivers invited to join the Ferrari Driver Academy and was confirmed as a member the following month. That same month, he was confirmed to race in the 2017 Toyota Racing Series with M2 Competition. Armstrong won the season opener on his debut, but retired in the third race due to a collision. His next would come at the third round in Hampton during the first race, but again failed to finish the third race after touching with Richard Verschoor. A further win and two second places in the final round saw Armstrong managed fourth in the championship.

Italian Formula 4 
In February 2017, it was announced Armstrong would race in both the ADAC F4 and Italian F4 championships with Prema Powerteam. Armstrong had a relatively slow start to the season, scoring three third-places and two non-scoring finishes across the opening two rounds. The next round at Vallelunga saw Armstrong claim his maiden win of the year From then, Armstrong's form had been stellar, winning three more times including appearing on the podium at all races during the second Mugello round. In the Monza season finale, Armstrong finished second in the first race, which was enough to claim the title with two races to spare.

ADAC Formula 4 
Armstrong partook in all races, as the races did not clash with his Italian F4 campaign. Armstrong had two non-scoring finishes in the first two rounds. However, he bounced back and took his first ADAC F4 win at the Red Bull Ring and two more podium finishes there. His podium streak continued towards Oscbersleben, scoring another win and a second place. Another win at the Nürburgring hauled him into championship contention, but eventually lost out to eventual champion and future F2 teammate Jüri Vips by a mere 4.5 points, and Armstrong settled as vice-champion.

FIA Formula 3 Championship

2018 

For 2018, Armstrong returned to the Toyota Racing Series with M2 Competition. Armstrong started his season in perfect fashion, taking third in the first race and winning the other two, though those wins would be the only one of the season. Armstrong continued his podium streak in Teretonga and Hampton, which increased his lead to 41 points. However, he only yielded one podium in the next five races, bringing the gap down to ten points over second-placed Robert Shwartzman and 23 points to Richard Verschoor. With four laps to go after a safety car restart, Armstrong had a mechanical failure whilst leading, and dropped to seventh at the flag. This was meant that Shwartzman and Verschoor dropped Armstrong to third in the championship, the former winning the championship. Overall, Armstrong lost the title by 15 points.

Armstrong continued his collaboration with Prema, graduating to the FIA Formula 3 European Championship, alongside fellow Ferrari juniors Robert Shwartzman and Guanyu Zhou. He scored a podium in just his second race at Pau, and a second place during the second round at the Hungaroring. His first win came at the Norisring and also capitalised by claiming two more podiums during the round, which saw him take the lead of the standings. He continued his championship lead for the next two rounds, which yielded two podiums. In Silverstone, Armstrong struggled with tyre wear and lost the lead of the standings to Dan Ticktum. At Misano, Armstrong scored a second place in the first race, but did not score in the other two which included a retirement in the third race from pole due to being hit from behind. Armstrong earned his ninth and last podium at the Red Bull Ring, but a triple retirement in the final round at the Hockenheimring saw him drop from 3rd to 5th in the standings, scoring 260 points.

At the season ending Macau Grand Prix, Armstrong finished eighth on his Macau debut having finished in the same position during the qualification race.

2019 

In 2019 before his main campaign, Armstrong returned to the 2019 Toyota Racing Series with M2 Competition. He started the season by taking podiums in all three races, He would take his first win at the only race at Teretonga. He took two wins in four races at Hampton Downs, which saw him take the lead of the championship from fellow Kiwi Liam Lawson. Armstrong had a suspension issue during the fourth round at Taupo, yet still won the final race during the round but lost the championship lead heading into the final round by five points to Lawson. In the first race during the final round, Armstrong beat Lawson in the first race, but ended the other two behind him. This meant that Lawson was the champion by ten points, and Armstrong ended the series as runner-up with 346 points and five wins.

Armstrong reunited with Prema Racing to contest the inaugural FIA Formula 3 Championship, partnering 2018 teammate Robert Shwartzman and Jehan Daruvala. In April 2019, Armstrong joined Nicolas Todt's All Road Management scheme. In the first round in Barcelona, Armstrong qualified third. He finished in the same position having tried to challenge Shwartzman on the opening lap. In Race 2, Armstrong made a strong start to take fourth on the opening lap, and later passed Max Fewtrell for third. However, Armstrong would fall to fifth place at the end of the race. Armstrong qualified fifth in Paul Ricard,  and had a strong Race 1 up till lap 16, where Armstrong collided and spun with Jake Hughes whilst fighting for second place. Hughes was out on the spot, but Armstrong managed to continue and finish sixth. Armstrong had bad luck in Race 2, where he stalled from starting third, but made a brilliant charge to take sixth place in the end.

At the Red Bull Ring, Armstrong topped practice and later took his first pole position of the year. He lost the lead to Renault junior Max Fewtrell and re-took it back later. However, him and Jüri Vips passed him which dropped Armstrong to third, and defended from teammate Daruvala to cling onto third and another podium. He later stated that "it was a lot more difficult to overtake than [I] expected". From sixth in Race 2, Armstrong quickly moved up into second behind Shwartzman and kept him honest for most of the race. On the final lap, Armstrong overtook Shwartzman however the Russian clipped Armstrong which punctured the New Zealander's rear tyre and fell to 19th. In Silverstone, Armstrong qualified on the front row in second, but dropped two places at the start. He re-passed Renault junior Christian Lundgaard and pressured Daruvala for second place, but ultimately settled for third. In Race 2, Armstrong sat in seventh for most of the race until Daruvala and Pedro Piquet collided on the penultimate lap, and also overtook Lundgaard to snatch fourth. At the Hungaroring, Armstrong qualified lower down in 13th. He was unable to progress through the field easily, during the first race and managed to take eighth place and claim reverse pole for Race 2. He defended from Leonardo Pulcini at the start, but managed to take his first victory of the season, in a lights-to-flag manner. Heading into the summer break and the final three rounds of the season, Armstrong sat fourth in the standings with 98 points, 36 off leader Shwartzman.

Armstrong had his worst qualifying of the year in Spa-Francorchamps, securing only 19th. In Race 1, Armstrong was up to 11th by lap 6, and cruised to eighth position to once again take reverse pole for the next race. He once again took victory by winning Race 2 over Yuki Tsunoda, and he dedicated his win to Anthoine Hubert, who died in a crash the night before. In Monza, Armstrong qualified second, but was demoted to start seventh for driving unnecessarily slowly. In Race 1, Armstrong bolted to second at the end of the opening lap when Lundgaard and Lirim Zendeli, before taking the lead on lap 4 from Richard Verschoor. However ten laps later, he would succumb the lead to Shwartzman and Armstrong would finish in second place. Unfortunately, he was penalised twenty seconds for exceeding the minimum delta time during the race's first safety car period and dropped to 21st. A small collision with David Beckmann saw Armstrong drop back, but recovered to 14th and end the weekend without points. Topping practice at the final round in Sochi, Armstrong went on to qualify third. In Race 1, he moved into the lead into the first corner, but lost the lead to Niko Kari on lap 9 and two further positions a lap later. Despite that, he would re-pass Pulcini and Kari back before overtaking Shwartzman on the final lap to claim the win while Shwartzman clinched the title. In Race 2, Armstrong moved up to third on lap 5 when Pulcini and Hughes collided. He passed Piquet on lap 17 to take second in the final race of the year. His result meant he became vice-champion and overhauled Daruvala's tally by one point. Overall, Armstrong scored 158 points whilst claiming three victories, seven podiums, three poles (two reverse), and four fastest laps.

Armstrong returned to participate in the 2019 Macau Grand Prix. finishing eighth in the overall race having started seventeenth on the grid. Armstrong finished 17th in the qualification race, but recovered and claimed eighth place.

Armstrong was ranked seventh in Motorsport.com's article of top 20 junior single-seater drivers in 2019.

FIA Formula 2 Championship

2020 
On 28 November 2019, it was announced Armstrong would graduate to the FIA Formula 2 Championship with ART Grand Prix to partner F3 rival and Renault Sport Academy member Christian Lundgaard. Before his debut F2 season, he stated that he "[felt] massively privileged" and "really confident". In the delayed start of the season, he qualified 13th in the Austrian opening round. He pitted very early on lap 8 during the feature race and his gamble would pay off, as he ran in fourth place once all drivers had pitted. When Guanyu Zhou and Mick Schumacher ahead encountered problems of their own, Armstrong capitalised on the opportunity and rushed to second placed podium on his debut.. During the sprint race, he made a lightning start, picking up four places on the opening lap to move into third. He nearly overtook Louis Delétraz on lap 7, but suffered a mechanical issue on lap 14 and was forced to retire from the race. During the second Austrian round, he qualified 12th. He made progress in the feature race and made his way to seventh place. Starting second in the sprint race, he was passed by Lundgaard at the start and later by Schumacher on lap 12. But just two laps later, Schumacher had a problem with his fire extinguisher and Armstrong re-took third place and claimed his second and last podium of the season.

Following that however, Armstrong went pointless for the next six rounds. It started in Hungary, where he qualified in the top ten for the first time that year. He lost three places in the feature race, and his race worsened as he tried to avoid the slowing Lundgaard and tagged Artem Markelov, sending the Russian into the barriers. Armstrong suffered damage and peeled into the pits to retire. He made a rocket start in the sprint race, he was up to 14th by the first lap. Armstrong overtook more of his rivals and narrowly missed out on points, in ninth as he lost the final points-paying position to Zhou on the last lap. The next five rounds yielded little for Armstrong, and he would get mediocre results. During the ninth round in Mugello, until the feature race in Mugello, Armstrong qualified fourth his joint-best qualifying of the year. He made a decent start, passing Callum Ilott at the start, but was overtaken by Luca Ghiotto seconds later. Armstrong ran in sixth place before the safety car periods, which he avoided the chaos following the first restart. He managed to take his first points since Austria in ninth place. and fell out of the top ten in the standings. In the sprint race, Armstrong made a great start to seventh, but was overtaken by many rivals and eventually finished 11th.

In Russia, Armstrong started 14th and took another points finish, claiming ninth in the feature race. In the red-flagged sprint, he lost four positions whilst running tenth after making a careless error and running wide, which left him to finish 14th. He qualified fourth again in Bahrain. He moved past Ticktum at the start, and later passed Ilott for second despite being on the harder tyres. However, he would soon be behind Schumacher, and fell back to third. Following the pit stops, he lost positions to his rivals and eventually secured seventh. Starting second in the sprint race, he would be overtaken by Nikita Mazepin midway through the race, then later overtaken by both Charouz drivers. However when Pedro Piquet had a mechanical issue, Armstrong went to finish fourth. He ended his season by finishing 11th and 14th in the final race. Overall, Armstrong ended 13th in the standings with 52 points compared to teammate Lundgaard's 149, his worst ever placing in a full-time series. He scored two podiums and five more points finishes.

2021 

For the 2021 season, Armstrong moved to DAMS to partner Roy Nissany. Having topped the final day of pre-season testing, while saying that "the intensity is really high". He qualified in 13th, and his sprint race 1 was relatively short as he suffered a power loss after just completing two laps. In Sprint Race 2, he had another unfortunate race. He impressively made his way up to sixth place by lap 13 but two laps later, the safety car was deployed due to a collision. He stayed out, and dispatched Bent Viscaal for second place during the restart. However, rivals on fresher tyres passed him and he eventually finished in tenth. In the feature race, Armstrong had a good beginning half of the race, as he was up to fourth by lap 8. He made a timely pit stop under the safety car and led the field. However, during the restart he dropped two places to Oscar Piastri and Richard Verschoor. He lost a few more places and capped off the race in fifth place. In Monaco, he qualified 14th and made up two places at the start of the first sprint. He inherited a place following Christian Lundgaard's retirement. On the final lap, he made a divebomb on Jehan Daruvala into the penultimate corner, sending him up to tenth and giving him reverse pole for the second sprint. Unfortunately, Armstrong was forced to start from the pit lane due to a car problem. Further issues continued and he dropped out of the race on lap 3. In the feature race, whilst running tenth, he collided with Jüri Vips, the Estonian driver shoving him into the wall and capping off a miserable weekend for Armstrong.

In Baku, he qualified sixth and would start fifth in sprint race 1. He made up a position at the start on Ralph Boschung but was back in fifth after being overtaken by Dan Ticktum. He lost two positions on the penultimate lap to end seventh, and was nearly passed by Vips on the line. In the second sprint, Armstrong battled Bent Viscaal on lap 8 following a safety car restart, but misjudged his braking point due to cold tyres and slammed into the wall, ending his race. His feature race barely lasted half a lap, as he was sent into the wall due to being hit by Théo Pourchaire, which was ultimately caused by Ticktum. By that point, Armstrong had only 12 points to his name, and trailed teammate Nissany in the standings. In Silverstone, he again qualified 14th and made a storming start in the first sprint race, moving up to ninth and remaining there for the entire race. Starting second in the second sprint race, Armstrong could not find a way past eventual race winner Richard Verschoor throughout the 21-lap race but managed to claim his first F2 podium in slightly more than a year. He had an uneventful feature race, he finished 12th.

In Monza, he qualified 17th and had poor performances in the sprint races, he ended 11th and 15th in sprint 1 and sprint 2 respectively. In the feature race, he started on the hard tyres and it would pay off as he managed to overtake some rivals following a safety car restart to finish tenth, though he was later promoted to ninth due to Verschoor's disqualification. In Russia where the second sprint was cancelled, Armstrong qualified 11th, and finished both races in the same position.

The inaugural race in Jeddah, saw the New Zealander qualify ninth, giving him second for the first sprint race. He managed to overtake fellow Kiwi Liam Lawson into the first corner. Despite Lawson pressuring him on the final lap, Armstrong held on and won his first Formula 2 race. On his win, Armstrong stated that the win was "a reward for the work done by [his] DAMS team during a difficult 2021 season". In the second sprint race however, his fortunes were reversed as he was hit from behind by Clément Novalak. In a shortened feature race, he secured points in eighth place. In Yas Marina, Armstrong finished sprint race 1 in tenth having started 11th, giving him reverse pole for the second time that year. He would be on course for his third podium of the season in the second sprint race, but had to retire due to an engine failure whilst leading the race. In the feature race, he went on the alternate strategy and overtook his rivals, which rewarded him with seventh in the end, despite attacking Ticktum in the dying minutes of the race. Armstrong once again ended his F2 campaign in 13th with 49 points, two podiums, five other points finishes while also beating teammate Nissany. Talking about the season in general, Armstrong admitted that “at times last year I felt like I was a bit blind," and that he didn't have the data to push for better results.

2022 

Having driven in the post-season test with them, Armstrong signed a deal to for Hitech Grand Prix during the 2022 season, partnering Jüri Vips. Shortly before the season, Armstrong commented that he "not going to give up" F1 seat and "[did] not want to leave anything off the table in 2022".

For the opening Bahrain round, Armstrong qualified 13th and made up positions until his race was cut short on lap 3 when Jake Hughes thumped him at the back, sending Armstrong into a stall. He had a much better feature race, starting on the softs saw the Kiwi up to third by lap 11. A late safety car saw him jump Felipe Drugovich and cross the line in fifth place. In Jeddah, he qualified fourth, but was given his first ever top-3 start after Jack Doohan was disqualified. In the sprint race, Armstrong was engrossed in a tight battle with Vips but the Estonian driver won out. With just three laps to go, Armstrong again retired as he spun, with his engine unable to get going. In the feature race, he was passed by Liam Lawson at the end of the opening lap, before regaining it as Lawson had a problem in the pits. However, Armstrong would end in fifth place as he was overtaken by Jehan Daruvala and Hughes towards the end.

In Imola, he qualified ninth, giving him a second place start for the sprint race. He made a decent start to jump Logan Sargeant off the line, and never looked back to take his first win of the year and second overall ahead of both Prema cars, despite having no radio for the entire race. In the feature race, he finished in 16th after an early safety car ruined his alternate strategy. The Barcelona round saw him end tenth after starting 13th in the sprint race. Again on the alternate strategy in the feature race, Armstrong would exit the pits in tenth, but fought back and claim seventh, passing Théo Pourchaire on the last lap.

Armstrong qualified seventh in Monaco. Starting fourth in the sprint race, he was immediately in third when Hughes stalled. He would remain in the position for the remainder of the race and claim another podium. His feature race was uneventful, he ended seventh, giving his first double points finish in an F2 event and climbed to fourth in the standings. In Baku, he qualified fourth. In the sprint race, he avoided all the chaos and broke through with a P4 finish. In the feature race, Armstrong passed Dennis Hauger at the start then later on Lawson during the lap 5 safety car restart. Another safety car restart on lap 15 saw the Kiwi lock up and nosed into the back of teammate Vips on the restart, and was forced to pit due to damage. Armstrong would eventually finish the race in 12th place, in a race which would have been so much more for the Kiwi driver.

In Silverstone, he started 12th and made up positions to claim ninth, narrowly missing points. In the feature race, he did manage points however, finishing eighth after having a good start that saw him P9 at the end of the first lap. During the Red Bull Ring round, he qualified tenth, giving him reverse pole for the sprint race. He proceeded to dominate the sprint race, leading every lap to claim victory. In the feature race on a drying track, some of his rivals opted to start on wets while the Kiwi was the leading driver on slicks. At Turn 3, Armstrong ran wide to avoid Richard Verschoor but was hit by another rival, and came to a halt moments later.

In France, he qualified eighth. Lining up third for the sprint race, he jumped Lawson at the start but he was back down in third on lap 4. On lap 19, Armstrong made an unsuccessful overtake and collided with Daruvala  which opened the door for Pourchaire, and the Frenchman forced him wide which dropped Armstrong to sixth. He was again forced off by Vips and he eventually finished in ninth, before being dropped to 14th for colliding with Daruvala. Once again in the feature race, his race finished on lap 1 as he was sent into a spin by David Beckmann, before being collected by Hauger. In Budapest, he took his first front row start in F2 by qualifying P2. Ending the sprint race in seventh, despite contact with Daruvala. In the feature race, he stormed into the lead passing polesitter Ayumu Iwasa before Turn 1. However, a slow pit stop saw him passed by Pourchaire and Iwasa towards the end. He would also be jumped by Enzo Fittipaldi. Drivers behind passed him on fresher tyres, and Armstrong had to settle with sixth place in the end.

In Spa-Francorchamps, he qualified 12th and made a brilliant start in the sprint race, passing five cars to take seventh place on the opening lap, and would finish in that position. In the feature race, he ended down in 13th after a penalty was given to him for forcing another driver off track. Zandvoort went better for him, he qualified ninth and started second for the sprint race. He was able to jump polesitter Clément Novalak and lead every remaining lap to claim his third win of the season. In the feature race, he made contact early on with Novalak while fighting over seventh but both came out unscathed. On the alternate strategy it was ruined when Marino Sato brought out the safety car, and Armstrong was not allowed to pit under safety car conditions. He pitted shortly after the safety car withdrew and he finished 14th.

In Monza, he qualified third. Armstrong initially finished sixth in the sprint race, but was given a five-second time penalty for gaining an advantage off-track. He was up to second before the pit stops and pitted during the lap 8 safety car but entered beyond the pit lane entry bollard which earned a ten-second stop and go penalty, and was added by another of the same penalty for speeding in the pit lane. He eventually finished in 12th. Armstrong had an uneventful Abu Dhabi weekend, he quietly achieved points in the feature race with ninth place. Once again, Armstrong ended 13th in the standings, with 93 points.

Formula One 
At the start of 2017 Armstrong became a member of the Ferrari Driver Academy. He made his F1 test debut in January at the Fiorano, driving the 2018 Ferrari SF71H, stating that "the car was not too difficult to drive". He tested the same car at Fiorano in April, completing more than 200km. Following his 2021 season, he and Ferrari parted ways. Speaking about his departure, the Kiwi said that "[he] knew [staying with the FDA] was a dead end".

IndyCar 
In October 2022, Armstrong tested an IndyCar car for the first time with Dale Coyne Racing at the Sebring International Raceway. Following the test, team boss Dale Coyne said that "he was a very good candidate" for Dale Coyne Racing, as the American-based team is currently intending to expand to three entries for the 2023 IndyCar Series.

Chip Ganassi Racing (2023–present)

2023 season 
On 2 December 2022, it was announced that Chip Ganassi Racing signed Armstrong to drive the No. 11 entry (formerly the No. 48) on the road courses and street circuits in 2023.

FIA World Endurance Championship 
In November 2022, Armstrong tested an endurance racing car for the first time, testing the LMP2 Alpine car at the Bahrain International Circuit.

Karting record

Karting career summary

Racing record

Racing career summary 

† As Armstrong was a guest driver, he was ineligible for points.
* Season still in progress.

Complete Eurocup Formula Renault 2.0 results 
(key) (Races in bold indicate pole position) (Races in italics indicate fastest lap)

† As Armstrong was a guest driver, he was ineligible for points.

Complete Formula Renault 2.0 Northern European Cup results 
(key) (Races in bold indicate pole position) (Races in italics indicate fastest lap)

Complete Italian F4 Championship results 
(key) (Races in bold indicate pole position) (Races in italics indicate fastest lap)

Complete ADAC Formula 4 Championship results 
(key) (Races in bold indicate pole position) (Races in italics indicate fastest lap)

Complete Toyota Racing Series results 
(key) (Races in bold indicate pole position) (Races in italics indicate fastest lap)

Complete FIA Formula 3 European Championship results 
(key) (Races in bold indicate pole position) (Races in italics indicate fastest lap)

Complete New Zealand Grand Prix results

Complete Macau Grand Prix results

Complete FIA Formula 3 Championship results 
(key) (Races in bold indicate pole position; races in italics indicate points for the fastest lap of top ten finishers)

Complete FIA Formula 2 Championship results 
(key) (Races in bold indicate pole position) (Races in italics indicate points for the fastest lap of top ten finishers)

‡ Half points awarded as less than 75% of race distance was completed.

American open-wheel racing results

IndyCar Series
(key) (Races in bold indicate pole position; races in italics indicate fastest lap)

References

External links 

 
 

2000 births
Living people
Sportspeople from Christchurch
New Zealand racing drivers
Formula Ford drivers
Toyota Racing Series drivers
Formula Renault 2.0 NEC drivers
Formula Renault Eurocup drivers
FIA Formula 3 European Championship drivers
Italian F4 Championship drivers
Italian F4 champions
ADAC Formula 4 drivers
FIA Formula 3 Championship drivers
FIA Formula 2 Championship drivers
IndyCar Series drivers
Double R Racing drivers
R-ace GP drivers
M2 Competition drivers
Prema Powerteam drivers
ART Grand Prix drivers
DAMS drivers
Hitech Grand Prix drivers
Karting World Championship drivers
Chip Ganassi Racing drivers